Sévis is a former commune in the Seine-Maritime department in the Normandy region in northern France. On 1 January 2019, it was merged into the new commune Val-de-Scie.

Geography

Population

Places of interest
 The church of St. Pierre, dating from the eleventh century.
 A sixteenth-century chateau.

See also
Communes of the Seine-Maritime department

References

Former communes of Seine-Maritime